The Lublin R-XVIII (otherwise known as Lublin R.XVIII) was a Polish heavy bomber project, created by Jerzy Rudlicki of the Plage i Laśkiewicz factory in Lublin, based on the earlier unsuccessful Lublin R-VII Odwet design of 1924, following the specification for a "retribution bomber" by the Polish Ministry of Military Affairs.

Design and development
The initial tri-motor R-VII was rejected along with all other proposals by Polish air manufacturers, as none were deemed skilled and experienced enough to build large, complicated bombers. Because of that the newly created 2nd Destroyer Squadron of the 1st Air Regiment in 1926 was equipped with 32 Farman Goliath bombers bought in France. However soon it became clear that the French bomber, designed in 1918, was already obsolete. Furthermore, the Goliaths were seriously underpowered and could not fly on one engine only, a serious flaw in a bomber. Because of that the Department of Air of the Ministry of Military Affairs renewed interest in a home-produced heavy bomber.

The Lublin-based Plage i Laśkiewicz works presented in 1929 the Lublin R–XVIII, while Podlaska Wytwórnia Samolotów submitted PWS-22 and PWS-23. The Lublin R-XVIII was in fact an upgraded and modified Lublin R-VII of 1924, utilising some of Rudlicki's concepts used in his 1922 "Project d'avion Ru - type chassis pliant" passenger plane design submitted as his doctoral thesis at the Ecole Nationale Supérieure d'Aéronautique in Paris in 1922.

One of the major modifications was the Rudlicki's own patented v-tail and a possibility to use a retractable landing gear, a novelty in the 1920s. Like its predecessor, the new plane was to have strong defensive armament and a crew of 6. In line with Giulio Douhet's theories, the plane was to be a "flying fortress", able to defend itself without the need for escort fighters. Because of that the machine gun field of fire covered 98% of the sphere around the bomber.

While superior to contemporary French-made bombers, the project was far from ready and the ministry decided that before serial production could commence, the design would already be outdated. Because of that in 1928 it ordered a Fokker F–VII B/3m bomber to be produced at Plage i Laśkiewicz works instead. However, the redesigned Lublin R-XVIII was rejected as well and none were ever built. Likewise the PWS-22 and PWS-23 were also rejected and eventually the unsuccessful LWS-6 Żubr was chosen as an interim design before the modern PZL.37 Łoś could be introduced in the 1930s.

Specifications (R-XVIII - trimotor version - estimated)

See also

References

1920s Polish bomber aircraft
R18